Giovanni Drenthe (born February 16, 1990) is a Surinamese footballer who currently plays as a striker for SV Excelsior. Drenthe also played for the youth teams of the Surinam. The attacker is the younger brother of football player Royston Drenthe.

Club career

SV Voorwaarts
In the SV Voorwaarts Drenthe mainly plays for the team promise. In the youth competition and Surinamese youth teams talent makes a big impression. He is one of the finest talents in Suriname. The excellent game at the youth teams may participate Drenthe several times with the main force. On January 6, 2008 Drenthe makes his appearance by scoring 8 goals in one match at the highest level in the derby against SV Robinhood (3-4 loss).

In September 2007, Drenthe and his compatriots Kromorejo Ruiz and Fabian van Dijk moved to the Netherlands to a three-week internship with the youth of SC Heerenveen. Drenthe played in exhibition games for Heerenveen in spite of level A1 and knew a good impression during his internship. In October, the players flew back to Suriname, pending further discussions. In consultation was discussed that SC Heerenveen's talents do not take over, but they are indefinitely will continue to assist in Suriname. In September 2009, Drenthe invited to Belgium internship will run from Germinal Beerschot. Drenthe came However, during his internship little games. The young striker got injured and could therefore not participate in the game against the promises of Zulte Waregem. then signed Drenthe in the summer of 2010 a contract with the Surinamese club SV Excelsior.

International career
Having played for the Surinamese youth teams shad, he made his debut in 2009 in the Suriname-A team. Due to his good performance during the 2008–09 season with both the Suriname under-20 side and SV Transvaal, Drenthe was included by coach Wensley Bundel included in the Surinamese squad for the Parbo Cup. With Drenthe, Suriname obtained a second-place finish in the four-Nations Tournament. In August 2010, Drenthe caused a stir: although Drenthe was called by acting coach Ricardo Winter, the attacker was undertaking an internship in Belgium and he forgot to decline for a match of the Suriname team. Drenthe was recalled by coach Kenneth Jaliens for the 2014 FIFA World Cup qualifiers.

Career statistics

References

External links
 
 Waterkant.net Article: End of training talents in Suriname Heerenveen

1990 births
Living people
Sportspeople from Paramaribo
Association football forwards
Surinamese footballers
Suriname international footballers
SVB Eerste Divisie players
S.V. Voorwaarts players
S.V. Excelsior players
Suriname under-20 international footballers
Suriname youth international footballers